The Three Chopt Road Historic District is a national historic district located at Richmond, Virginia.  The district encompasses 90 contributing buildings, 4 contributing sites, and 4 contributing structures located west of downtown Richmond. The primarily residential area developed starting in the early-20th century as one of the city's early "streetcar suburbs." The buildings are in a variety of popular late-19th and early-20th century architectural styles including frame bungalows, Colonial Revival, Tudor Revival, and Mission Revival. There are a remarkable group of unusually large, architect-designed houses and churches. Notable non-residential buildings include St. Bridget's Catholic Church (1950) and St. Stephen's Episcopal Church.  Located in the district is the separately listed Green's Farm (Huntley).

It was added to the National Register of Historic Places in 2012.

References

Streetcar suburbs
Historic districts on the National Register of Historic Places in Virginia
Colonial Revival architecture in Virginia
Tudor Revival architecture in Virginia
Mission Revival architecture in Virginia
Buildings and structures in Richmond, Virginia
National Register of Historic Places in Richmond, Virginia